Martin Schmitt (born 29 January 1978) is a German former ski jumper who competed from 1997 to 2014. He is one of Germany's most successful ski jumpers, having won the World Cup twice; a gold medal at the Winter Olympics; four gold medals at the World Championships; and a ski flying world record. His and his countryman Sven Hannawald's success further popularized ski jumping in Germany, and with particular help from cable TV station RTL, their coverage received great acclaim in the late 1990s and early 2000s.

Career
Beginning his competitive career at the Furtwangen area skiing club in Germany, Schmitt's first great success came when, as a schoolboy at the Furtwangen ski boarding school, he achieved a bronze medal in the 1997 FIS Nordic World Ski Championships in Trondheim. The following season, he won the team large hill silver at the 1998 Winter Olympics in Nagano.

In 1998/99 Schmitt won the team World Cup for the first time and triumphed at the 1999 FIS Nordic World Ski Championships in Ramsau by winning the individual and team large hill events. He successfully defended his World Cup title in 1999–2000.

Schmitt enjoyed particular world success in ski jumping between 1999 and 2001. With 28 world cup successes (10 in the 1998/1999 season, 11 in 1999/00, 6 in 2000/01, and 1 in 2001/02), he finished seventh in the world rankings behind Gregor Schlierenzauer (53 victories), Matti Nykänen (46 victories), Adam Małysz (39 victories), Kamil Stoch (39 victories), Janne Ahonen (36 victories), and Jens Weißflog (33 victories). At the FIS Nordic World Ski Championships, he won eight medals (including four gold), and at the Winter Olympics he won two silver medals and one gold medal.

He had his best season in 2000/01 by finishing second behind Adam Małysz for the World Cup title. At the 2001 FIS Nordic World Ski Championships in Lahti, he won both the individual and team large hills. In addition he gained a silver medal in the individual normal hill and a bronze in the team normal hill. Consequently, he became the first ski jumper to win four medals at the FIS Nordic World Ski Championships.

After the 2001 season, Schmitt began to suffer from injuries, and could no longer equal his earlier successes. Nonetheless, in the 2001/2002 season he won another team gold at the 2002 Winter Olympics in Salt Lake City, as well as winning silver in the WC at Harrachov. His last world cup success was on 1 March 2002 in Lahti.

After many back injuries in the 2004/05 season, he did not take part in the World Cup for many weeks, in order that he could be better prepared for the 2005 FIS Nordic World Ski Championships in Oberstdorf. There he won a silver medal in the team normal hill. Schmitt returned to win a silver in the individual large hill event at the FIS Nordic World Ski Championships 2009 in Liberec.

Despite the lack of wins for over a decade Schmitt continues to compete. For the 2012/13 season he had to compete in the second tier FIS Ski Jumping Continental Cup. Until just days before the start of the prestigious Four Hills Tournament it looked as if he would not be nominated for the first time since the 1996/1997 edition. A surprise win at the Continental Cup competition at Engelberg (Switzerland) just two days before the first four hills competition at Oberstdorf earned him a last-minute inclusion in the 'national group', a group of additional German entries allowed for the first two jumps at Oberstdorf and Garmisch-Partenkirchen. By performing strongly, even being the best-placed German after the first jump at Garmisch-Partenkirchen, Schmitt got a surprise promotion back into the main squad, which allows him to participate in the two Austrian competitions in Innsbruck and Bischofshofen.

World Cup

Standings

Wins

Ski jumping world records

 Not recognized! Ground touch at world record distance.

References

1978 births
Living people
People from Villingen-Schwenningen
Sportspeople from Freiburg (region)
German male ski jumpers
Olympic ski jumpers of Germany
Ski jumpers at the 1998 Winter Olympics
Ski jumpers at the 2002 Winter Olympics
Ski jumpers at the 2006 Winter Olympics
Ski jumpers at the 2010 Winter Olympics
Olympic gold medalists for Germany
Olympic silver medalists for Germany
Olympic medalists in ski jumping
FIS Nordic World Ski Championships medalists in ski jumping
Medalists at the 2010 Winter Olympics
Medalists at the 2002 Winter Olympics
Medalists at the 1998 Winter Olympics
World record setters in ski flying
Recipients of the Order of Merit of Baden-Württemberg